Cleora acaciaria is a moth of the family Geometridae described by Jean Baptiste Boisduval in 1833. It is found in Angola, Cameroon, Comoros, Congo, Ghana, Madagascar, Réunion São Tomé and Príncipe and the United Arab Emirates.

The wingspan is 28–33 mm.

The larvae feed on various plants and trees, including Rutaceae (including Toddalia asiatica), Ericaceae (including Augauria salicifolia), Verbenaceae (including Stachytarpheta urticifolia) and Asteraceae species.

References

External links

Cleora
Moths described in 1833
Moths of Africa
Moths of Asia